Naqi Ali Khan (1830-1880) (urdu: نقی علی خان) was an Indian Sunni Hanafi Islamic Scholar, Mufti and father of Ahmed Raza Khan. Naqi Ali wrote 26 books on Seerah and Aqedah and he issued thousand Fatwas.

Family tree

Publications
 Asool Ul Rishaad (اصول الرشاد لقمع مباني الفساد)
 Fazayle E Dua (فضائل دعا)
 Tafsir e Surah Alamnashrah Explanation of Ayat (تفسیر سورہ الم نشرخ).

See also
Ahmed Raza Khan
Maulana Kaif Raza Khan

References

Further reading
 Phd Thesis on Naqi khan (urdu)
 Related Books on Archive.org
 Read more on Mufti Naqi Ali Khan from Dawat-e-Islami's magazine

1830 births
1880 deaths
Barelvi
Indian Sufis
Critics of Shia Islam
Hanafi fiqh scholars
Hanafis
Maturidis
Indian Sunni Muslim scholars of Islam
Writers in British India
People from Bareilly
Scholars from Uttar Pradesh
People from Bareilly district
19th-century Indian non-fiction writers
19th-century Muslim scholars of Islam
Indian Sunni Muslims
Barelvis
Ahmed
Indian people of Pashtun descent
Barech